Man: Whence, How and Whither, A Record of Clairvoyant Investigation, published in 1913, is a theosophical book compiled by the second president of the Theosophical Society (TS) - Adyar, Annie Besant, and by a TS member, Charles W. Leadbeater. The book is a study on early times on planetary chains, beginnings of early root races, early civilizations and empires, and past lives of men.

Introduction 

At the beginning of the book the authors wrote that "metaphysicians, ancient and modern, declare that Past, Present, and Future are ever simultaneously existent in the divine Consciousness, and are only successive as they come into manifestation, i.e., under Time which is verily the succession of states of consciousness." Hence, when a mystic turns the soul away from earth and focuses his attention upon the spirit – the soul may approach the "Memory of Nature", the personification in the material world of the "Thoughts of the Logos," the image, as it were, of "His Mind." There resides the Past in ever-living records.

The authors say that "they, having been taught the method of gaining touch, but being subject to the difficulties involved in their uncompleted evolution, have done their best to observe and transmit, but are fully conscious of the many weaknesses which mar their work. Occasional help has been given to them by the Elder Brethren."

Explorations of past lives 

Leadbeater speculated that "the total number of souls, or Monads, making up humanity was sixty thousand million, the majority being out of incarnation at any given time." Thus reincarnation had been one of the doctrines of the Theosophical Society almost from its beginnings. The principal characters (so-called "star names" or pseudonyms) are identified in the following table.
Alcyone —  Krishnamurti.
Fides — G. Arundale.
Herakles — Besant.
Lomia — Wedgwood.
Phocea — Judge.
Polaris — Wadia.  
Selene — Jinarajadasa.  
Sirius — Leadbeater.
Siwa — Subba Row. 
Spica — F. Arundale. 
Ulysses —  Olcott.
Vajra — Blavatsky.
Leadbeater wrote later that "the two hundred and fifty characters to whom names have been assigned are supposed to be less than one tenth of the whole". Professor Joscelyn Godwin said, "The series of incarnations showed these pioneers going through their own evolution from subhumans to worldly and spiritual leaders of the race."

Early root races

In Lemuria 

In the chapter VII the authors describe in detail a remarkable Lemurian:
"In Lemuria there was some domestication of animals; the egg-headed Lemurian was seen leading about a scaly monster, almost as unattractive as his master. Animals of all sorts were eaten raw – among some tribes human flesh was not despised – and creatures of the grade of our slugs, snails and worms, much larger than their degenerate descendants, were regarded with peculiar favor as toothsome morsels."

In Atlantis 
In the chapter IX the authors wrote about Atlantis that "explosions of gas, floods and earthquakes" razed Ruta and Daitya, the great islands, left from the cataclysm of 200,000 B.C., and only the island of Poseidonis remained, the last vestige of the once grand continent of the Atlantis. These islands were lost in 75,025 B.C., Poseidonis survived to 9,564 B.C., when it also was devoured by the ocean.

The authors assert in the chapter X of the book:
"The immense growth of wealth and of luxury gradually undermined the most splendid civilization that the world has yet seen. Knowledge was prostituted to individual gain, and control over the powers of nature was turned from service to oppression. Hence Atlantis fell, despite the glory of its achievements and the might of its Empires."

On the Moon chain 

Blavatsky wrote in The Secret Doctrine  that the Moon "plays the largest and most important part, as well in the formation of the Earth itself, as in the peopling thereof with human beings". The "Lunar Monads" or Pitris, the progenitors of man, become in reality man himself. A religious studies scholar Isaac Lubelsky stated that Besant and Leadbeater write in the book the chain of the Moon "was an evolutionary precursor of the chain of the planet Earth."

In the chapter III the authors describe in detail how Sirius, Alcyone, Herakles and Mizar achieved individualization and left the animal kingdom while living as lunar monkey-creatures. They were servants to a family of lunar men, the leaders of which are now the Masters M. and K.H. Leadbeater wrote that "individualization from the animal kingdom usually takes place through association with the humanity of the period. Such examples of it as we occasionally see taking place round us at the present time will serve as instances for us." Some peculiar domestic animal, well treated by its human friends, is stimulated by its permanent contact with them up to the point where it breaks away from the group-soul to which it has previously belonged. The authors wrote:
"One night there is an alarm; the hut is surrounded by savages, supported by their domesticated animals, fierce and strong, resembling furry lizards and crocodiles. The faithful guardians spring up around their master's hut and fight desperately in its defence; Mars comes out and drives back the assailants, using some weapons they do not possess; but, while he drives them backward, a lizard-like creature darts behind him into the hut, and catching up the child Surya begins to carry him away. Sirius springs at him, bearing him down, and throws the child to Alcyone, who carries him back into the hut, while Sirius grapples with the lizard, and, after a desperate struggle, kills it, falling senseless, badly mangled, over its body.  Meanwhile, a savage slips behind Mars and stabs at his back, but Herakles, with one leap, flings himself between his master and the weapon and receives the blow full on his breast, and falls, dying. The savages are now flying in all directions, and Mars, feeling the fall of some creature against his back, staggers, and, recovering himself, turns. He recognizes his faithful animal defender, bends over his dying servant, and places his head in his lap. The poor monkey lifts his eyes, full of intense devotion, to his master's face, and the act of service done, with passionate desire to save, calls down a stream of response from the Will aspect of the Monad in a fierce rush of power, and in the very moment of dying the monkey individualizes, and thus he dies – a man."

Fruits of Evolution 

The theosophical concept of Evolution suppose spiritual development of the Mankind will attain the fullness of the stature of Buddha, Christ, etc. of the prize of the high calling of God in Christianity.

The authors the book proclaimed "when the Human Kingdom is traversed, and man stands on the threshold of His superhuman life, a liberated Spirit", seven paths open before Him for His choosing: He may enter into the blissful omniscience and omnipotence of Nirvana, with activities far beyond our knowing, to become, perchance, in some future world an Avatara, or godlike Incarnation; this is sometimes called, "taking the Dharmakaya vesture". He may enter on "the Spiritual Period" — a phrase including unknown meanings, among them probably that of "taking the Sambhogakaya vesture". He may become part of that treasure-house of spiritual forces on which the Agents of the Logos draw for Their work, "taking the Nirmanakaya vesture". He may remain a member of the Occult Hierarchy which rules and guards the world in which He has reached perfection. He may pass on to the next Chain, to aid in constructing its forms. He may enter the majestic Angel – Deva-Evolution. He may give Himself to the immediate service of the Logos, to be used by Him in any part of the Solar System, His Servant and Messenger, who lives but to carry out His will and do His work over the whole of the system which He controls.

Criticism 
A religious studies scholar Alvin Kuhn wrote in his thesis that The Canadian Theosophist, a magazine published at Toronto, announced a series of articles in which "parallel passages from the writings of Mrs. Blavatsky and the Mahatma Letters on one side, and from the books of Mrs. Besant and Mr. Leadbeater, on the other (Man: whence, how and whither included), gave specific evidence bearing on the claims of perversion of the original theories by those whom they call Neo-Theosophists."

John Prentice in an article Clairvoyant Research criticized the book of the authors. He proclaimed that the material for the Peruvian lives in Man: whence, how and whither (Ch. XI) had been lifted out of Garcilaso de la Vega's Royal Commentaries on the Yuccas of Peru (written in 1609 and published in English translation in 1638, 1869 and 1871).

Joseph Fussell wrote about "abnormal and preposterous claims" published by Besant and Leadbeater.

Helena Roerich stated that Leadbeater's books are a mix of "false and ugly" statements and some fragments of truth: one of the Great Masters supposedly called the book Man: Whence, How and Whither as "a work which devoid of knowledge, honesty and beauty." She wrote: "The book by Besant and Leadbeater is particularly awful, therein is described the lives supposedly the Great Masters and some their pupils, namely: Besant, Leadbeater... I've never seen anything equal to this tasteless blasphemy and falsehood."

Professor Olav Hammer stated that Leadbeater's claims about past lives "were increasingly used to buttress power struggles." He wrote, "Those who supported the controversial Leadbeater were recorded as having had important roles in the past, while his opponents were depicted as villains."
 In his thesis Hammer wrote:
"How can Leadbeater's readers know that his clairvoyant results really are 'records' and 'information', rather than delusions or deliberate fabrications? His response is feeble, 'there is no assurance. The investigators themselves are certain <...> of the difference between observation and imagination'."

Alice Bailey stated that the book published at Adyar by Besant and Leadbeater was "psychic in his implications and impossible of verification". In her Unfinished Autobiography she wrote that it proved to her the "untrustworthiness" of Leadbeater's writings:
"Books were being published at Adyar by Mr. Leadbeater that were psychic in their implications and impossible of verification,  carrying a strong note of astralism. One of his major works, Man: Whence, How and Whither, was a book that proved to me the basic untrustworthiness of what he wrote. It is a book that outlines the future and the work of the Hierarchy of the future, and the curious and arresting thing to me was that the majority of the people slated to hold high office in the Hierarchy and in the future coming civilisation were all Mr. Leadbeater's personal friends. I knew some of these people—worthy, kind, and mediocre, none of them intellectual giants and most of them completely unimportant."

Publications

See also 
 Clairvoyance
 Esoteric Buddhism
 How Theosophy Came to Me
 The Rosicrucian Cosmo-Conception
 The Secret Doctrine
 Thought-Forms
 Theosophy and science

Notes

References

Sources

External links 
Man: Whence, How and Whither hosted at Archive.org
Man: Whence, How and Whither
Man: Whence, How and Whither

Translations
 "Der Mensch — woher, wie und wohin: Aufzeichnungen hellseherischer Untersuchungen"
 "Человек: откуда и как (фрагменты)"
 "Человек: куда (фрагменты)"

1913 books
Theosophical texts
Books about reincarnation
Books about the paranormal
Esoteric anthropogenesis
Occult books